A Crime (Swedish: Ett brott) is a 1940 Swedish crime drama film directed by Anders Henrikson and starring  Edvin Adolphson, Karin Ekelund and Carl Barcklind. It was shot at the Centrumateljéerna Studios in Stockholm and on location in the city. The film's sets were designed by the art director Arthur Spjuth. It was adapted from a 1933 play of the same title by Sigfrid Siwertz, itself inspired by the real-life Von Sydow murders case.

Cast
 Edvin Adolphson as 	Rutger von Degerfelt
 Karin Ekelund as Maud, Rutger's Wife
 Carl Barcklind as Andreas von Degerfelt
 Anders Henrikson as 	Hans von Degerfelt
 Ziri-Gun Eriksson as 	Maria Gilljams
 Gösta Cederlund as 	Inspector Lilja
 Håkan Westergren as 	Bror Risberg
 Sigurd Wallén as Hugo von Degerfelt
 Dagmar Ebbesen as 	Mrs. Sofia Duner
 Einar Axelsson as	Dr. Bernhard Gilljams
 Ulla Sorbon as 	Lisa Waldemars
 Åke Claesson as 	Dr. Forenius
 Hilda Borgström as 	Miss Alma Furuvik
 Gösta Bodin as 	Mr. Duner
 Karin Alexandersson as 	Kristin
 Ivar Kåge as 	Rosensköld
 Sten Hedlund as 	Redlund
 Gösta Hillberg as Prison Guard
 Oscar Åberg as 	Berggren 
 Tord Bernheim as 	Man in the garage

References

Bibliography 
 Qvist, Per Olov & von Bagh, Peter. Guide to the Cinema of Sweden and Finland. Greenwood Publishing Group, 2000.

External links 
 

1940 films
Swedish crime films
1940 crime films
1940s Swedish-language films
Films directed by Anders Henrikson
Swedish black-and-white films
Films set in Stockholm
Films shot in Stockholm
Swedish films based on plays
1940s Swedish films